San Luis is a statutory town that is the county seat and the most populous town of Costilla County, Colorado, United States. Formerly known as San Luis de la Culebra, it is the oldest continuously occupied town in Colorado. The population was 629 at the 2010 census.

History

The Town of San Luis is centuries younger than the pueblos and villages of northern New Mexico because Hispanic settlers were wary of venturing north of the 37th parallel north for fear of Ute and Comanche raids. Armed traders traveled the Old Spanish Trail through the area in the early 19th century. In 1821, the Treaty of Córdoba recognized the independence of Mexico from the Spanish Empire. San Luis was in Sangre de Cristo Land Grant awarded by the government of New Mexico to the Carlos Beaubien family in 1843. The Treaty of Guadalupe Hidalgo annexed northern Mexico to the United States in 1848, and the Compromise of 1850 created the U.S. Territory of New Mexico.

Hispanic settlers from the Taos Valley established several small villages along the Rio Culebra in the San Luis Valley and officially took possession of this portion of the Sangre de Cristo Land Grant on April 9, 1851. The settlers built a church in the central village of La Plaza Medio and dedicated it on the Feast of Saint Louis, June 21, 1851, renaming the village San Luis de la Culebra in honor of the saint.

The United States Army established Fort Massachusetts in 1852 and Fort Garland in 1858 to provide protection for the settlers in the valley. The village of San Luis remained part of the Territory of New Mexico until 1861 when the Territory of Colorado was established. San Luis became the seat of Costilla County in 1863, and remains so to this day. Colonel Christopher "Kit" Carson, Commander of Fort Garland, negotiated a treaty with the Ute people in 1867. Colorado became a state in 1876 and the Town of San Luis was incorporated in 1885. Today, San Luis is the oldest continuously inhabited town in the State of Colorado.

A Pueblo Chieftain article dated June 8, 1872, describes the three stores of San Luis as kept by Fred Meyer & Co, Auguste Lacome and Mazers & Rich in addition to a blacksmith, butcher, beer saloon, carpenter and two hotels.

Today, the town is renowned for its Stations of the Cross ascending the local mesa. The town celebrates the Fiesta de Santiago y Santa Ana each July and the San Luis Manito Christmas celebration in December.

Geography
The town of San Luis lies in the San Luis Valley at  (37.201988, -105.422360). Colorado State Highway 159 leads north  to Fort Garland and U.S. Route 160, and south  to the New Mexico border. Highway 142 leads west  to Manassa.

Demographics

At the 2000 census, there were 739 people, 322 households and 200 families residing in the town. The racial make-up of the town was 60.49% White, 0.27% African American, 2.44% Native American, 0.14% Pacific Islander, 29.50% from other races and 7.17% from two or more races. Hispanic or Latino of any race were 88.77% of the population.

There were 322 households, of which 28.3% had children under the age of 18 living with them, 40.7% were married couples living together, 16.8% had a female householder with no husband present and 37.6% were non-families. 33.2% of all households were made up of individuals and 14.0% had someone living alone who was 65 years of age or older. The average household size was 2.30 and the average family size was 2.94.

23.4% of the population were under the age of 18, 7.3% from 18 to 24, 21.7% from 25 to 44, 27.9% from 45 to 64 and 19.8% were 65 years of age or older. The median age was 43 years. For every 100 females, there were 94.5 males.  For every 100 females age 18 and over, there were 89.9 males.

The median household income was $14,213 and the median family income was $20,875. Males had a median income of $20,156 and females $13,333. The per capita income was $8,887. About 29.9% of families and 34.3% of the population were below the poverty line, including 41.1% of those under age 18 and 21.2% of those age 65 or over.

See also

Old Spanish National Historic Trail
Culebra Range
Auguste Lacome

References

External links

Town of San Luis official website
CDOT map of the Town of San Luis

County seats in Colorado
Hispanic and Latino American culture in Colorado
Populated places established in 1851
Towns in Costilla County, Colorado
Towns in Colorado
1851 establishments in New Mexico Territory